There have been several icebreakers known as Semyon Dezhnev.

Early in World War II Germany made arrangements with the Soviet Union for the German auxiliary cruiser Komet to transit the Northern Sea Route across the top of Siberia, so it could raid allied merchant shipping in the Pacific Ocean.
As a ruse de guerre the Komet disguised herself as the Soviet icebreaker Semyon Dezhvev so it could avoid allied detection as it proceeded up the Norwegian coast.

In 2010 a Russian icebreaker named Semyan Deznev served in Baltic Sea.

The ships were named after a 17th-century Russian explorer named Semyon Dezhnyov, credited as being the first European to transit the Bering Strait.

References

Semyon Dezhnev